The 37th Annual Japan Record Awards took place on December 31, 1995, starting at 6:30PM JST. The primary ceremonies were televised in Japan on TBS.

Award winners 
Japan Record Award:
Tetsuya Komuro (producer) & trf for "Overnight Sensation"
Best Vocalist:
Joji Yamamoto
Best New Artist:
Junko Miyama

External links
Official Website

Japan Record Awards
Japan Record Awards
Japan Record Awards
Japan Record Awards
1995